Mediterranean Squadron may refer to:

Mediterranean Squadron (France) a former French Navy squadron
Mediterranean Squadron (United Kingdom) a former Royal Navy squadron
Mediterranean Squadron (United States) a former United States Navy squadron